The Twenty-third Oklahoma Legislature was a meeting of the legislative branch of the government of Oklahoma, composed of the Oklahoma Senate and the Oklahoma House of Representatives. The state legislature met in regular session at the Oklahoma State Capitol in Oklahoma City from January 2, 1951, to May 18, 1951, during the term of Governor Johnston Murray.

Dates of session
Regular session: January 2-May 18, 1951
Previous: 22nd Legislature • Next: 24th Legislature

Party composition

Senate

House of Representatives

Leadership
Senate President Pro Tem: Boyd Cowden
House Speaker: James Bullard
Speaker Pro Tempore: James Williams
Majority Floor Leader: A. R. Larason

Members

Senate

Table based on 2005 Oklahoma Almanac.

House of Representatives

Table based on government database.

References

Oklahoma legislative sessions
1951 in Oklahoma
1952 in Oklahoma
1951 U.S. legislative sessions
1952 U.S. legislative sessions